The rail transport in the island state of Australia, Tasmania, has had many train accidents since their historic opening in 1871. Here's a list of train accidents that have occurred in Tasmania's railway network.
Hobblers Bridge Launceston Australia Day 
1 fatality 1970  ..? 1 seriously injured.

Fatal accidents

Bridgewater, 1886
On 22 July 1886 an express train from Launceston whilst crossing the viaduct at Bridgewater, the swing bridge opened and the engine fell into the river. The fireman and another person were supposed to have drowned.

Zeehan, 1887
2 killed.

Horseshoe Bridge, 1893 
On 30 September 1893, a passenger train with 60 people on board derailed due to sabotage on the Horseshoe Bridge near Brighton Junction station. The saboteur(s) have never been found.

Campania, 1916
The engine jumped the rails, and dragged after it the three front carriages. The carriage nearest the engine was smashed to pieces, while several others received injuries.

The accident occurred just before 4 o'clock. The train was rounding a curve, but a fairly easy one, as compared to some of the curves higher up the line. According to the statements of passengers, the speed was not very great, and no one seems to have any idea how the accident occurred.

Conara, 1992
On 1 December 1992, one person was killed.

Launceston, 2006
One person killed. The freight company Pacific National admitted that it failed to provide a safe work system when a man died at its Launceston (East Tamar maintenance depot) railyards. The man was killed at Pacific National's when a wagon he was inspecting was shunted from the other end and pinned him.

Spreyton, 2010
On 26 September 2010 a boy was killed when his all-terrain vehicle collided with a train on a private road in Tasmania's north. The teenager failed to stop at a stop sign on a private driveway and rode into the path of a train carrying cement at Spreyton, just south of Devonport. He was thrown under the train and died instantly.

See also

 List of rail accidents

References

Accidents
Tasmania
Disasters in Tasmania
Tasmania-related lists
History of transport in Tasmania